Shreiner Farm is a historic farm and national historic district located at Manheim Township, Lancaster County, Pennsylvania. The district includes seven contributing buildings.  They are a stone Pennsylvania style farmhouse, a stone Pennsylvania bank barn (1828), a frame tobacco barn (c. 1900), a frame and stone summer kitchen (c. 1830), and three frame sheds.  The farmhouse was built about 1830, and is a 2 1/2-story, four bay by two bay, rectangular fieldstone dwelling.

It was listed on the National Register of Historic Places in 1994.

References

Farms on the National Register of Historic Places in Pennsylvania
Historic districts on the National Register of Historic Places in Pennsylvania
Houses completed in 1830
Houses in Lancaster County, Pennsylvania
1830 establishments in Pennsylvania
National Register of Historic Places in Lancaster County, Pennsylvania